Michael Battle may refer to:

 Michael A. Battle (attorney) (born 1955), American lawyer, Director of the Executive Office for United States Attorneys
 Michael J. Battle (born 1963), American theologian and academic who worked with and was ordained by Desmond Tutu
 Michael Battle (diplomat) (born 1950), American diplomat, Ambassador to the African Union, 2009–2013